A brazier is a container used to burn charcoal or other solid fuel for cooking, heating or cultural rituals. It often takes the form of a metal box or bowl with feet. Its elevation helps circulate air, feeding oxygen to the fire. Braziers have been used since ancient times; the Nimrud brazier dates to at least 824 BC.

History

The word brazier is mentioned in the Bible. The Hebrew word for brazier is believed to be of Egyptian origin, suggesting that it was imported from Egypt. The lone reference to it in the Bible being the following verse:

 - the winter palace of King Jehoiakim was heated by a brazier.

Roman Emperor Jovian was poisoned by the fumes from a brazier in his tent in 364, ending the line of Constantine.

Uses

Heating
Despite risks in burning charcoal on open fires, braziers were widely adopted for domestic heating, particularly and somewhat more safely used (namely in unglazed, shuttered-only buildings) in the Spanish-speaking world. Fernando de Alva Cortés Ixtlilxochitl noted that Tezozomoc, the Tlatoani of the Tepanec city of Azcapotzalco, slept between two braziers because he was so old that he produced no natural heat. Nineteenth-century British travellers such as diplomat and scientist Woodbine Parish and the writer Richard Ford, author of A Handbook for Travellers in Spain, state that widely braziers were considered healthier than fireplaces and chimneys.

The brazier could sit in the open in a large room; often it was incorporated into furniture. Many cultures developed their own variants of a low table, with a heat source underneath and blankets to capture the warmth: the kotatsu in Japan, the korsi in Iran, the sandali in Afghanistan, and the foot stove in northern Europe. In Spain the brasero continued to be one of the main means of heating until the early 20th century; Gerald Brenan described in his memoir South from Granada its widespread habit in the 1920s of placing dying embers of a brazier beneath a cloth-covered table to keep the legs and feet of the family warm on winter evenings.

Scent
Moist rose and grapevine trimmings produce a pungent, sweet-smelling smoke, and make charcoal, but unless fully pre-dried (seasoned or kilned) as with wood, do produce carcinogenic particulates in the air.

Aromatics (lavender seeds, orange peel) were sometimes added to the embers in the brazier.

A "brazier" for burning aromatics (incense) is known as a censer or thurible.

Other
In some churches a brazier is used to host a small fire, called new fire, which is then used to light the Paschal candle during the Easter Vigil.

Braziers were common on industrial picket lines, largely replaced by protest marches and rallies, and a newspaper casts strikes as more white collar as a further reason for their decline.

The Japanese translation is hibachi - principally for cooking and in cultural rituals such as the Japanese tea ceremony.

Since 1957 Dairy Queen has used the word "brazier" on their signage to indicate the particular locations that serve hot food like hot dogs and hamburgers, etc..

Gallery

See also

 Asado
 Angithi, a traditional Indian brazier
 Barbecue grill
 Chafing dish, a cooking implement
 Hibachi, a Japanese brazier
 List of cooking appliances
 Fire basket
 Torch
 Cresset, a cup for burning oil
 Kanger, a traditional Kashmiri personal heating device
 Crucible

References

Burners
Cooking appliances
Heating